Sergio Martínez vs. Paul Williams, billed as The Explosive Rematch, was the rematch between Martínez and Williams which took place on November 20, 2010. They last fought in December 2009 with Williams winning a controversial 12-round majority decision at the Boardwalk Hall in Atlantic City, New Jersey. Williams landed more shots in the fight, but Martínez landed the cleaner punches throughout.

Build-up 
Martínez was making his first title defense after defeating Kelly Pavlik for the WBO world middleweight title on April 17, 2010. Williams had also fought once since their initial meeting, winning a four-round technical decision against Kermit Cintron in a May junior middleweight bout, after Cintron fell out of the ring and injured his head.

One of the reasons it took so long to finalize Martínez-Williams II was because the Williams camp was not eager for the fight. Dan Goossen  hoped to line up a big fight for Williams at welterweight, where he used to hold a title, against an opponent such as Manny Pacquiao or Shane Mosley.

When promoter Lou DiBella ran out of patience waiting for the Williams side to accept the fight in mid-August, DiBella cut off talks and offered the fight to junior middleweight contender Alfredo "El Perro" Angulo, a network staple in recent years. However, when Angulo turned down $750,000, a career-high purse by more than double, Martínez's camp made another run at Williams and this time accepting the fight on November 20.

The fight 
The HBO-televised fight took place at Boardwalk Hall, Atlantic City, New Jersey, United States.

The fight was billed as a potential "fight of the year", however the fight ended abruptly and dramatically when Sergio Martínez delivered a knockout blow with 2:02 left in the 2nd round of the scheduled 12 round fight.  The punch was a short left hook that caught Williams right on the chin, as he attempted to deliver a left-hand of his own.  Williams' right hand was at his waist when the punch landed, rendering Paul Williams unconscious upon contact.

Undercard

Televised 
Middleweight Championship:  Sergio Martínez (c)   vs  Paul Williams
Martínez defeats Williams via KO at 1:10 of round 2.

Untelevised 
Middleweight bout:  Fernando Guerrero vs   Willis Lockett
Guerrero defeats Lockett via TKO at 1:06 of round 4.
Heavyweight bout:  Tony Thompson vs  Paul Marinaccio
Thompson defeats Marinaccio via TKO at 2:02 of round 4.
Welterweight bout:  Willie Nelson vs.  Quinton Whitaker
Nelson defeats Whitaker via TKO at 2:22 of round 1.
Featherweight bout:  Luis Orlando Del Valle vs  Noe Lopez Jr.
Del Valle defeats Lopez Jr via TKO at 1:48 of round 3.
Cruiserweight bout:  Zsolt Erdei vs  Samson Onyango
Erdei defeats Onyango via unanimous decision (79-73, 80-72, 80-72). This was Erdei's first fight in a year.
Welterweight bout:  Steve Upsher Chambers vs  Bayan Jargal

References

External links 
http://boxrec.com/media/index.php?title=Fight:1541357

2010 in boxing
2010 in sports in New Jersey
November 2010 sports events in the United States
Boxing matches at Boardwalk Hall